Chachran Sharif, is a town in Khanpur Tehsil of the Rahim Yar Khan District, in the Punjab state of Pakistan.
Chacharan Sharif is a historical town of District Rahim Yar Khan which is attributed with the name of famous 19th century poet and saint Khawaja Ghulam Farid and it is called Farid city as he was born and lived in this city. This city is situated at the east bank of Indus River and is the last northern town of District Rahim Yar Khan. After it the territory of District Rajan Pur begins; Mithankot, another historic town is directly across the river Indus on its west bank.

A new Baynazeer bridge is built on the Indus River useful for connection between two districts – R. Y. Khan & Rajan Pur. In this way, the bridge facilitates travel for thousands of people of the District Rahim Yar Khan and District Rajan Pur. There are many villages (mouzas) near Chachran Sharif like Pahuran, Mud Adil, Beit Mughal, Mehran, Hasil Pur, Mouza Chachar, Mouza Chandia, Mouaza Hamid Pur, Faiz Abad, and Hyder Abad.

History
Some historians have mentioned in their books like Professor Saeed Ahmed Saeed has quoted in his book  "Political History: Rahim Yar Khan" on Page 30, Mr. Yahya Amjad in his book "The History of Old Pakistan" on page # 446, Professor H. C. Rae Chaudhri in his book " Political History of Initiant India" and Mr. Muhammad Hassan Dani in his book " Tamur Garha" on page 20 to page 22, mentioning that Malo was an ancient Arian democratic state. People of Malo tribe during the period of Alexander the Great lived near the linking point of Indus and Ravi Rivers, probably on the eastern side at Chachran, Allah Abad, Khanpur and Rahim Yar Khan. So it is concluded that around 326 BC, Chachran was like a basic city in that state. Shahzada Mirza Mehmood Shah cited in his travelling story on page # 46 that Chacharan at the bank of the Indus River is in the premises of Bahawalpur. It is said that it was a big city back then and its population was like the population of Multan.

There was a big harbour in Chachran before the birth of Khawaja Ghulam Farid in the 19th century. Big boats used to be here and people used to do business here on boats at that time. However Chachran got more famous after the renowned poet Khawaja Ghulam Farid lived here and became known as Chachran Sharif thereafter. Mostly the people of Chachar tribe used to live here and are still living here. So it has become known as Chachran Sharif.

Courts
There are no courts in Chachran Sharif itself. However, there is a sub-divisional headquarters for courts in Khanpur Tehsil, which comprises two honourable additional session judges and five civil judges. The bar consists of 280 members. Many Advocate from the town are practicing in the sub-division court

Area politicians
Local Politicians are Sardar jam Ishaq pahur,Jam Khalid Jamil Pahore,Ahmad Khan Lound Advocate, Sahibzada Iqbal Fareed Koreja, Jam Ghulam Mohammed Khalti, Asif Basheer Khan Ghori, Sahibzada Muhammad Fareed Koreja, Sardar Fawad Ahmad Khan Lound Advocate, Sardar Shahzad Ahmad Khan Lound are some famous politicians of town Chacharan Sharif area.

Sahibzada Muhammad Fareed Koreja was recently elected Chairman of the town.

Town is located the Constituency from where Currently elected MNA is the Minister of Development and elected MPA is the Finance Minister of Punjab. Mr. Khusro Bakhtiar & Mr. Hashim Jawan Bakhat respectively. In Past Elected MNA'S & MPA"s are also served Pakistan as Ministers Like Makhdoom Shahaab-Ul-Deen, Mian Abdul Sataar, Sadrdar Mohammed Nawaz Khan, Mian Shafee Mohammed and many more famous names of Pakistani Politics.

Major tribes
The main clans of the Chachran area are the pahore,Chachar, Syed, Malik Sulangi, Malik Balhara, Mirani, Ghouri, Koreja, Gishkori, soomro, Qureshi, Pahur, Awan, Dashti, Chachar, Mughal, Khawaja, Mian, Rajput, Bhatti, Baloch, Arain, Jat, Jam, Abbasi, Malik, Jatoi, Gharro, Mirani, Khokhar and Patafi. Prior to the partition of British India in 1947, at least one third of the population consisted of Hindus with predominance of Aroras who conducted much of the business and finance of the town. They left for India after the 1947 partition.

Sport in Chachran Sharif

Cricket
The game of Cricket is widely played in the city, and the community of the city thoroughly enjoys it as an enjoyable alternative in terms of recreation. The city is home to many talented cricketers of Pakistan. The city once used to host a large cricket ground, which was generally maintained by the mayor of the city and the town committee as well as prominent members of the city community. However, the municipality later demolished the ground and constructed a central park, much to the dismay of some people and their demands.

Famous places and tourist attractions
One of the famous tourist attractions of the city is the Minchan Bund of Chachran Sharif. Khawaja Ghulam Farid Saran was built in the eighteenth century. The building structure is a blend of multi-cultural architecture, incorporating a typical eighteenth-century design as well as a traditional touch of both old and modern form of Pakistani architecture. Along With, Bank of the Indus River is the attraction for all tourists visiting town pertaining to the natural landscaping and attractable locations for a fresh breath and peace of Mind.

Education
The government high schools for girls & boys are both separately providing education in many disciplines. There are many private schools also providing quality education such as saeedia fareedia high school etc.

Poets
Khawaja Ghulam Farid was a famous poet of Chachran Sharif. He wrote many books of poetry as well as of Islamic sciences.

 Muhammad Maaz pahore
 Mudassir Alvi
 sherryar Azam
 Junaid Abbas mirani
 JAM KALOO MIRANI

Languages
Saraiki is the major language that is widely spoken. Other national languages of Pakistan, Urdu and English, and Punjabi are also fluently spoken and understood, especially at formal events. Some people can speak, write or understand the Arabic language as well.

Tombs 
There are Few famous Shrines or Darabrs (Tombs) in Chachran Sharif and in the surrounding areas.

These tombs are of:
 Khwaja Ghulam Fareed in Kot Mithan which is almost at 9 km distance from his city Chachran Sharif 
Tomb and Mosque of Jalaluddin Surkh-Posh Bukhari at nearby Uch Sharif

Bibliography
Saeed Ahmed Saeed, "Political History Rahim Yar Khan" page 30
Yehya Amjad, "The History of Old Pakistan" page 446
H. C Rae Chaudhri, Political History of Initiant India"
Muhammad Hassan Dani "Tamur Garha"

References

External links

Populated places in Rahim Yar Khan District